We Have the Technology is the fourth studio album by Australian band Custard. It was released in September 1997. Three singles were lifted from the album, "Nice Bird", "Anatomically Correct", which reached #48 in the fifth Hottest 100 and "Music Is Crap," which reached #24 in the sixth Hottest 100.

Reception
Rolling Stone Australia said, "We Have The Technology is Custard exploring the dimensions of being their band. It's not just David McCormack directing traffic, it's all four members actively drawing on their experiences and natural enthusiasm for creating sounds and tunes. It's an immense pleasure to listen to an album made with such a liberal attitude, with a combined sense of fearless abandon and bedroom tinkering. Custard are fun. They're also smart, but don't blow their cover."

Rave said, "Custard are developing a special skill -- an ability to seem somewhat dippy on the surface and using that to lighten up more serious notions. The influences seem to come from everywhere and nowhere but are melded into a loose-limbed, gangly pop - gawky, with energy to burn but no apparent control mechanism in place. They're at their most methodical here, delivering an eclectic but even more willful collection of stupid/smart morsels of cracked pop."

The Courier-Mail noted, "Whereas the first two albums explored Custard's unique style of comedic pop, We Have the Technology is a more plenary opus, in lyrical content and musical style. The musicality of the release provides plenty of those moments that remind the listener why Custard is adored."

Track listing

Contains untitled hidden track.

Charts

References

1997 albums
Custard (band) albums